The 2018 Bahamas Bowl was a college football bowl game played on December 21, 2018. It was the fifth edition of the Bahamas Bowl, and one of the 2018–19 bowl games concluding the 2018 FBS football season. Sponsored by Elk Grove Village, Illinois, the game was officially called the Makers Wanted Bahamas Bowl.

The game featured the FIU Panthers of Conference USA against the Toledo Rockets of the Mid-American Conference. The matchup was announced on November 25, 2018, making this the first bowl matchup of the season to have both teams confirmed.

Teams
This was the fourth matchup between these two teams, with FIU holding a 2–1 lead in the series. They met in the 2010 Little Caesars Pizza Bowl, which FIU won, 34–32.

FIU Panthers

FIU accepted a bid to the Bahamas Bowl on November 25. The Panthers entered the bowl with an 8–4 record (6–2 in conference). FIU's usual starting quarterback, James Morgan, was unavailable for the game due to a sore shoulder, resulting in backup Christian Alexander getting the start.

Toledo Rockets

Toledo accepted a bid to the Bahamas Bowl on November 25. The Rockets entered the bowl with a 7–5 record (5–3 in conference).

Game summary

Scoring summary

Statistics

References

External links

Box score at ESPN

Bahamas Bowl
Bahamas Bowl
FIU Panthers football bowl games
Toledo Rockets football bowl games
December 2018 sports events in North America
Bahamas Bowl